Piya Ke Milan Ki Aas is a thumri song of Hindustani classical music. It was popularized by Kirana Gharana's founder Abdul Karim Khan. It is in raga Mishra - Jogiya.

References

Indian songs